The Saab 32 Lansen (English: "The Lance) is a two-seat, transonic military aircraft designed and manufactured by Saab AB from 1955 to 1960 for the Swedish Air Force (Flygvapnet). Three principal variants of the Lansen were built for attack (A 32A), fighter (J 32B), and reconnaissance (S 32C). During its long operational life, the Saab 32 also served in the electronic warfare role and as a target-tug.

Development
In Autumn 1946, the Saab company began internal studies aimed at developing a replacement aircraft for the Saab B 18/S 18 as Sweden's standard attack aircraft. In 1948, Saab was formally approached by the Swedish Government with a request to investigate the development of a turbojet-powered strike aircraft to replace a series of 1940s vintage attack, reconnaissance and night-fighter aircraft then in the Flygvapnet: the B 18/S 18, J 21R/A 21R and J 30 (de Havilland Mosquito). Out of several differing design studies performed, including a twin-engine aircraft intended to be powered by a pair of de Havilland Ghost turbojet engines, Saab settled on a single-engine design, which was initially designated the P1150.

On 20 December 1948, a phase one contract for the design and mock-up of the proposed aircraft was issued, formally initiating development work upon the P1150. The requirements laid out by the Swedish Air Force for the P1150 were demanding: it had to be able to attack anywhere along Sweden's 2,000 km (1,245 miles) of coastline within one hour of launch from a central location. It had to be capable of being launched in any weather conditions and at day or night.  In response, Saab elected to develop a twin-seat aircraft with a low-mounted wing, and equipped with advanced electronics. The P1150 would break new grounds for the Swedish Air Force, being their first two-seat jet aircraft, and the first to carry a built-in search radar.

Saab had initially envisaged powering the P1150 with the indigenously produced STAL Dovern turbojet engine. However, both timescale and technical difficulties encountered during the development of the Dovern resulted in the Swedish government electing to substitute the intended Dovern engine with the license-built Rolls-Royce Avon Series 100 turbojet engine, designated RM.5, instead. The single Avon engine provided the Saab A 32A with a thrust to weight ratio of about 0.3, and enabled the aircraft to be roughly 10,000lb heavier than the twin engine Saab 18 it replaced; the later-produced J 32B interceptor variant received the upgraded and significantly more powerful RM6A Avon engine instead.

On 3 November 1952, the first P1150 prototype conducted its first flight. The design of the prototypes had initially featured both Fowler flaps and a leading edge slot; this slot was discarded as unnecessary after trials with the prototypes and never appeared on subsequent production aircraft. Triangular fences were added near the wing roots during flight testing in order to improve airflow when the aircraft was being flown at a high angle of attack. A small batch of P1150 prototypes completed design and evaluation trials with series production of the newly designated Saab 32 Lansen beginning in 1953. Development work on the project was recorded as having involved more than 2,000,000 man-hours in total.

In Development 1955, the first production A 32A Lansen attack aircraft were delivered to the Swedish Air Force; deliveries of this variant proceeded through to mid 1958, at which point manufacturing activity switched to the other two variants of the Lansen, the J 32B and S 32C. These two models differed substantially from the first, the J 32 B being fitted with a new engine for greater flight performance along with new navigation and fire control systems.  On 7 January 1957, the first J 32 B Lansen conducted its maiden flight; on 26 March 1957, the first S 32C Lansen performed its first flight. Production of the Lansen continued until May 1960.

Design

The Saab 32 Lansen had a simple general arrangement, being one of the first aircraft in the world to be specifically developed to fly attack missions.

Its basic design features it was designed from came from Switzerland. It included drawings on Messerschmitts P.1101, P.1110, P.1111 and P.1112. SAAB's project manager Frid Wänström retrieved these secret papers from Switzerland to Sweden in 1945. The documents came from engineers from Messerschmitt who fled to Switzerland at the end of the Second World War. Among them were the engineer and aerodynamicist Hermann Behrbohm, who came to be part of Saab's core in the team around Saab 29 Tunnan and upcoming aircraft types like the Saab 32 Lansen and Saab 35 Draken.

From the outset, it was designed to provide good support for the installation of electronic warfare and weapons systems. The aircraft could be armed with a total of four 20 mm cannon, as well as wing pylons for various calibers of rockets and assorted bombs. The J 32 variant carried four 30 mm ADEN cannons while the A 32 ("A" stands for attack) had an armament of four 20 mm Bofors m/49 cannon hidden under flaps in the nose. The J 32 differed substantially from the other variant, Saab describing it as "to all intents a new aircraft", being fitted with a more powerful engine and newer armaments and different radar.

The Lansen's nose also contained the Ericsson mapping and navigation radar, the forward antenna of which was housed in a large blister fairing underneath the fuselage, directly forward of the main landing gear; this radar worked in conjunction with the Rb 04C anti-ship missile, one of the earliest cruise missiles in western service. The attack variant of the Lansen could carry up to two RB04 missiles, one underneath each wing. On the reconnaissance variant of the Lansen, up to six cameras can be installed in the place of the four cannon, the camera bodies required the installation of chin blisters on the upper fuselage of the nose; the Lansen could also carry up to 12 M62 flash bombs for night photography.

The fuselage of the Lansen was very well streamlined being the first aircraft for which the outer skin curvature and joints between skin panels had been defined by mathematical calculation in order to reduce drag. This was an early application of computer technology. The wing had a 10 per cent laminar profile and a 35° sweep. hydraulically-boosted ailerons and large Fowler flaps on the wings comprised the main flight control surfaces, as did the hydraulically-assisted elevators of the powered tailplane; a total of four airbrakes were also present on the sides of the rear fuselage. The Lansen had a tricycle undercarriage with a single wheel on all of the landing gear. Other wing features include one-section stall fences on the outer-thirds of the wing, a pitot tube on the right wingtip, and three underwing hardpoints. To test the 35° sweepback design of the Lansen's wing, a half-scale wing was mounted on a Saab Safir, designated Saab 202 Safir.

The Lansen was powered by an afterburning Svenska Flygmotor RM5 turbojet engine, which was a license-produced Rolls-Royce Avon RA.3/Mk.109 engine manufactured by Svenska Flygmotor. For easy maintenance access to the engine, the aircraft's entire aft fuselage was detachable. The air intakes for the engine were located just forwards and above the wing. The two-man pilot and navigator crew were contained in a pressurised cockpit equipped with a single-piece clamshell canopy; a second windscreen separates the cockpit in between the pilot and navigator to protect the latter in case of inadvertent jettisoning of the canopy.

Operational history
On 25 October 1953, a SAAB 32 Lansen attained a Mach  number of at least 1.12 while in a shallow dive, exceeding the sound barrier. In December 1955, deliveries of the A 32A attack variant formally commenced, allowing the swift retirement of the last piston-powered B 18 bomber from Swedish service shortly thereafter. According to Bill Gunston and Peter Gilchrist, the A 32A proved to be extremely effective, both in terms of serviceability and the accuracy of its armaments. Between 1958 and 1960, a total of 54 S32 C reconnaissance aircraft were manufactured. The last Lansen to be built was delivered to the Flygvapnet on 2 May 1960.

One intended use for the A 32A was as an aerial delivery system for nuclear or chemical weapons.  During the 1950s and 1960s, Sweden had operated a nuclear weapons program, however never produced such weapons.

Accidents destroyed a third of all Lansens during 25 years of service, killing 100 crew along with 7 civilians in Vikbo.  The accidents were due to a combination of technical faults, the aircraft not being ready for service, and training deficiencies in regards to flying at night and in adverse weather. In the 1960 Vikbo crash, pilot Uno Magnusson's A 32A suffered an engine outage, and ejected before crashing into a farmhouse, killing all seven civilian occupants. The crash was due to a known fault which occurred when a drop tank was fitted; the fighter variant J32 B had been forbidden from using the drop tank.  Replacement parts to correct the fault were available at the base but had not yet been fitted. The crash's causes were suppressed from the public by the Flygvapnet press office; as the victims were civilians, they were not included in official accident statistics.

The A 32 Lansen was Sweden's last purpose-built attack aircraft. The replacement of the A 32A formally began in June 1971, the more advanced Saab 37 Viggen being slowly used to take over its attack responsibilities.  As the type was gradually being replaced by more modern types, the Saab 32 continued to be operated into the late 1990s as target tugs and electronic warfare platforms, a total of 20 J 32Bs having been converted for these duties. By 2010, at least two Lansens were still operational, having the sole task of taking high altitude air samples for research purposes in collaboration with the Swedish Radiation Safety Authority; one of these collected volcanic ash samples in mid 2010. As of April 2020 all aircraft have been withdrawn from active service.

Variants

A 32A
Ground-attack and maritime-strike version. 287 aircraft built between 1955 and 1957, retired in 1978. Armed with four 20 mm Bofors M/49 cannons and could carry two SAAB RB 04 missiles, unguided rocket pods and a variety of different bombs up to 3x600 kg bombs.
J 32B
 All-weather fighter version initially operated only for bad weather and night fighter duties. Two prototypes and 118 production aircraft built between 1958 and 1960, retired in 1973. Armed with four 30 mm ADEN guns, Rb 24 missiles (license-built AIM-9 Sidewinder), or 75 mm unguided rocket pods. J 32B was powered by more powerful Svenska Flygmotor RM6A (Rolls-Royce Avon Mk 47A) engine.
S 32C
Specialized maritime and photo reconnaissance version developed from A 32A. 45 aircraft built between 1958 and 1959, retired in 1978. Equipped with PS-432/A radar with extended range and with six cameras – two SKa 23 (Fairchild K-47), one SKa 15 (Williamson F49 Mk 2) and three SKa 16 (Vinten F95).
J 32D
Target tug version. Six J 32B were modified, retired in 1997.
J 32E
ECM (electronic warfare and countermeasures) version used also for ECM training.  Fourteen J 32B were modified, retired in 1997. Aircraft was equipped with jamming system G 24 in one of three versions (for L, S or C bands) used for jamming ground and naval radars. Additionally Adrian (for S and C bands) and Petrus (for X band) pods were used for jamming aerial radars.
J 32AD
Project of day fighter version from 1953 as interim solution between the J 29 Tunnan and J 35 Draken, designated J 32AD ("D" stands for Dag [day]). Aircraft was lighter, without radar and armed with four 20 mm and one 30 mm guns in nose and different missiles. None built, 120 Hawker Hunter fighters bought instead.
J 32U
Project of fighter version from 1954 ("U" stands for utveckling [development]) with much better performance than J 32B. Aircraft was equipped with more powerful Rolls-Royce RA 19R engine and had improved wing design. None built.
J 32S/J16
 In 1969 at the Norrbotten Wing (F 21) 4 aircraft of the J32B version were modified to become a kind of snow remover by using the heat from the engine to melt snow and ice. The wings and the tail was removed and a small cabin was added on top of the fuselage. Where engine outlet earlier had been, there was now a square pipe, which lead the air down to the ground. The type was only tested and evaluated at F 21 until 1971, when the project was cancelled. The project was cancelled due to low efficiency and a very high fuel-consumption. There was also a problem with the welding in the pipe. The naming of the version is pretty simple, J32S (S stands for Snö [Snow]) and J16 simply because half of the aircraft was removed in order to create the J32S.

Surviving aircraft
One aircraft has been restored to flying condition and takes part in air force shows. This is a J32D model which was formerly 32606, but is now officially registered SE-RME.

Additionally, a number of non flying airframes are on static display at various museums and (former) air force bases, including one in the United States. 
 #32070: Gate guardian at Skaraborg Wing (F 7) in Såtenäs.
 #32085: In a museum at former Hälsinge Wing (F 15) in Söderhamn.
 #32127: On display by the drive way to the civilian terminal in Halmstad. Consists of parts from 32127, 32094 and, after the overhaul in 2019, the rear part of 32035.
 #32151: In a museum at former Blekinge Wing (F 17) in Kallinge.
 #32197: At the Swedish Air Force Museum in Linköping.
 #32259: Gate guardian at former Västgöta Wing (F 6) in Karlsborg
 #32284: On display in Paso Robles at the Estrella Warbirds Museum.
 #32510: On display in the Österreichisches Luftfahrtmuseum at Graz airport, Austria. 
 #32512: In a museum at the former Göta Wing, today Aeroseum, Säve, Göteborg.
 #32543: On display in Museum of Aeronautics and Astronautics (Madrid) (F 3) in Cuatro Vientos, Madrid, Spain.

Operators

 Swedish Air Force
 F 1 Hässlö
 F 3 Malmslätt
 F 4 Frösön
 F 6 Karlsborg
 F 7 Såtenäs
 F 11 Nyköping
 F 12 Kalmar
 F 13 Norrköping
 F 14 Halmstad
 F 15 Söderhamn
 F 16 Uppsala
 F 17 Kallinge
 F 21 Luleå

Specifications (J 32B)

See also

Notes

References

Bibliography

 Erichs, Rolph et al. The Saab-Scania Story. Stockholm: Streiffert & Co., 1988. .
 Forsgren, Jan. "Database: Saab 32 Lansen". Aeroplane, November 2010, vol 38 no. 11, issue 451. pp. 64–74.
 Gunston, Bill and Peter Gilchrist. Jet Bombers: From the Messerschmitt Me 262 to the Stealth B-2. Osprey, 1993. .
 "Saab: Sweden's Advanced Combat Aircraft." Flight International, 30 December 1960. pp. 1017–20.
 Taylor, John W.R. "Saab 32 Lansen (Lance)." Combat Aircraft of the World from 1909 to the present. New York: G.P. Putnam's Sons, 1969. .
 This Happens in the Swedish Air Force (brochure). Stockholm: Information Department of the Air Staff, Flygstabens informationsavdelning, Swedish Air Force, 1983.
 Wagner, Paul J. Air Force Tac Recce Aircraft: NATO and Non-aligned Western European Air Force Tactical Reconnaissance Aircraft of the Cold War. Dorrance Publishing, 2009. .
 Wilson, Stewart. Combat Aircraft since 1945. Fyshwick, Australia: Aerospace Publications, 2000. .

External links

 Saab 32 Lansen – an Overview
 The photo flying Saab J32D Lansen in Swedish colours is operated by heritage flight of the Flygvapnet (Swedish Air Force) – 2012.
 Ekstrand, O. "Swedish Test Flying." Flight, p. 704. 12 November 1954.

32
1950s Swedish attack aircraft
1950s Swedish fighter aircraft
Single-engined jet aircraft
Nuclear weapons programme of Sweden
Low-wing aircraft
Aircraft first flown in 1952